Mansurabad (also Romanized as Manşūrābād) is a village in Paskhan Rural District, in the Central District of Darab County, Fars Province, Iran. At the 2006 census, its population was 541, in 123 families.

References 

Populated places in Darab County